Walter J. "Wally" Hennessey (born October 4, 1956) is a Hall of Fame harness racing driver. He was inducted into the Prince Edward Island Sports Hall of Fame in 2006, the United States Horse Racing Hall of Fame in 2007 and the Canadian Horse Racing Hall of Fame on August 6, 2014.

Hennessey drove his first horse to victory in 1975. On June 13, 1992, at Buffalo Raceway Hennessey won seven New York Sire Stakes events, including a track-record six in a row. He won his 8,000th career race on February 18, 2012.

Walter Hennessey relocated to the United States during the late 1980s and currently makes his home in Coconut Creek, Florida.

Wally Henessey was the main driver of champion Moni Maker.

References

External links
Walter Hennessey Profile

1956 births
Living people
Canadian harness racing drivers
Canadian Horse Racing Hall of Fame inductees
United States Harness Racing Hall of Fame inductees
Sportspeople from Charlottetown
People from Coconut Creek, Florida